Amina Haleyi (born 10 September 1992) is an Algerian footballer who plays as a goalkeeper for ASE Alger Centre and the Algeria women's national team.

Club career
Haleyi has played for Alger Centre in Algeria.

International career
Haleyi capped for Algeria at senior level during the 2021 Arab Women's Cup.

References

External links

1992 births
Living people
Algerian women's footballers
Women's association football goalkeepers
Algeria women's international footballers
21st-century Algerian people